The International Symposium on Physical Design, or ISPD is a yearly conference on the topic of electronic design automation, concentrating on algorithms for the physical design of integrated circuits.  It is typically held in April of each year, in a city in the western United States.  It is sponsored by the SIGDA of the Association for Computing Machinery and the IEEE Council on Electronic Design Automation (CEDA).

ISPD is purely a technical conference with no associated trade show.

See also 
Design Automation Conference
International Conference on Computer-Aided Design
Asia and South Pacific Design Automation Conference
Design Automation and Test in Europe

References

External links 
Main web page for the ISPD conference

IEEE conferences
Electronic design automation conferences
Association for Computing Machinery conferences